Nemopteridae, the spoonwings, are a family of neuropteran insects. They are also called thread-winged antlions. They are found in the Ethiopian, Palearctic, Australasian and Neotropical realms but absent in North America (though a fossil has been found in Colorado).

Their flight is delicate and they have a circling flight to avoid walls when they are trapped indoors. The long streamer is conspicuous when the insects are flying and these are the elongated and spatulate hindwings.

Male nemopterids have a bulla on the wing usually along the margin or wing base that is used to disperse pheromone.

Taxonomy

There are two distinct subfamilies in the family Nemopteridae:

Subfamily Crocinae, mostly nocturnal and crepuscular species with often a narrow habitat preference. They are found in arid desert zones and have a wide distribution along the southern fringes of the west Palearctic and Western Asia, as well as in dry Neotropical, Afrotropical, and Australian areas.
Afghanocroce
Amerocroce
Anacroce 
Apocroce
Austrocroce
Carnarviana
Concroce
 Cretocroce Lu et al. 2019 – Cenomanian Burmese amber, Myanmar
Croce 
Dielocroce
Josandreva
Laurhervasia 
Moranida
Necrophylus
Pterocroce
Pastranaia 
Thysanocroce
Tjederia 
Veurise
Subfamily Nemopterinae – diurnal, with a greater diversity. Genera include:
 Barbibucca
 Lertha
 Nemoptera
 Nemopterella

Other nemopterid genera include:

 Brevistoma
 Chasmoptera
 Cratonemopteryx Martins-Neto 1992 – Crato Formation, Brazil, Aptian
 Derhynchia
 Halter
 Halterina
 Knersvlaktia
 Krika Martins-Neto 1992 – Crato Formation, Brazil, Aptian
 Lertha
 Nemeura 
 Nemia 
 Nemopistha
 Nemopterella 
 Palmipenna 
 Parasicyoptera 
 Pterocroce 
 Roesleriana Martins-Neto 1997 – Crato Formation, Brazil, Aptian
 Savigniella 
 Semirhynchia
 Sicyoptera 
 Stenorrhachus

References

External links

 Taxonomy – Nemopteridae 
 Larval Stages of European Nemopterinae, with Systematic Considerations on the Family Nemopteridae (Insecta, Neuroptera). Also available on Researchgate

Neuroptera
Neuroptera families